Dino Marcan (born 12 February 1991 in Rijeka, Yugoslavia) is a Croatian professional tennis player. Dino mostly competes on the ATP Challenger Tour.

Career statistics

Singles titles (2)

References

External links
 
 

1991 births
Living people
Croatian male tennis players
Sportspeople from Rijeka
French Open junior champions
Grand Slam (tennis) champions in boys' doubles
21st-century Croatian people